Mikhail Sergeevich Vaskov (born March 4, 1994, in Dmitrov, Moscow Oblast, Russia) is a Russian male curler. He was the skip for the Russian national men's curling team at the 2018 European Curling Championships.

Awards
 Master of Sports of Russia (curling, 2015).
 Russian Men's Curling Championship: silver (2017), bronze (2018).
 Russian Men's Curling Cup: silver (2016).
 European Junior Curling Challenge: gold (2015).
 Russian Mixed Curling Championship: bronze (2012, 2013).
 Russian Mixed Curling Cup: bronze (2018).
 Russian Mixed Doubles Curling Championship: bronze (2018, 2020).
 Russian Mixed Doubles Curling Cup: silver (2018).

Teams and events

Men's

Mixed

Mixed doubles

References

External links

Living people
1994 births
Russian male curlers
Curlers at the 2012 Winter Youth Olympics
People from Dmitrovsky District, Moscow Oblast

Sportspeople from Moscow Oblast